Sivappu Mazhai is a 2010 Tamil action film written and directed by V. Krishnamurthy. Earlier referred to as Guinness Vision, the film was made in 11 days 23 hours 45 minutes, breaking the Guinness World Record. The film features the Tamil Canadian multiple Guinness World Record-holder Suresh Joachim, who produced the film, in the lead role, whilst Meera Jasmine, Vivek and Suman play other prominent roles.

Plot
The film revolves around Nandhan (Suresh Joachim), a Sri Lankan youth who kidnaps Meera Jasmine, a Minister's daughter and a television journalist.

The Minister (Suman) is helped by the Director General of Police (Rajeev) and his subordinate (Bose Venkat) to rescue Meera. Things take a turn when they get an interesting demand from Nandhan seeking the release of a certain Sri Lankan national detained by the police.

Cast
 Suresh Joachim as Nandan
 Meera Jasmine as Samyukta
 Sonu as Nurse
 Vivek as the bungalow's caretaker 
 Suman as Minister
 Rajeev as DGP
 Bose Venkat as Subordinate
 T. P. Gajendran
 Alex as a Sri-Lankan Refugee
 Cell Murugan as the caretaker's assistant

Production

Development
Guinness Hall of Famer and Canada's #1 record breaker Suresh Joachim of Canada produced the "Sivappu Mazhai" movie in 11 days 23 hours and 45 minutes in Chennai India.  The world fastest movie is scheduled for theatrical release in April 2010 around the world.

Suresh took on the leading role along with Meera Jasmine. The film is directed by V. Krishnamurthy. Music - Deva, Dialogue – Prabhakar, film editing – V.T. Vijan, Lyrics – Vairamuthu. 
 
Previous Record:  scripting to screening in 13 days for The Fastest Forward (UK 1990). Produced By Russ Malkin and directed by John Gore (both UK)

Suresh, along with 1,000 crew, completed the 2 hours, 3 minute movie in 11 days, 23 hours, and 45 minutes.  The clock started as soon as the script writer started to write the script. The Kollywood film industry and the artists, who worked on this film, are very satisfied with the results and very proud of the achievement. This film was made from 22 May 2009 @ 6:30pm to 3 June 2009 @ 6:15pm. 
The film was made in 11 days 23 hours & 45 minutes (starting from writing the story, screenplay, composing 4 songs, title, shooting up to 60 scenes and editing it into a two-hour feature-length film. 
 
The film was directed by V Krishnamurthy, who had worked as assistant director in films including Pulan Visaranai, Captain Prabhakaran and Rassaiyah. Prominent artistes including Meera Jasmine, Vivek, Suman, Bose Venkat, Rajeev, Thiyagu, Alex form part of the cast. The other credits are John E (screenplay), V Prabhakar (dialogues), Srinivasm, Indrajith and Jamal Deen (cinematography), Deva (music), Vairamuthu (lyrics), V. T. Vijayan (editing) and Kathir (art direction), Sheik Dawood G & Karthik B (line producers-Skykap Production). The attempt was made to create awareness on peace and universal brotherhood.

Suresh Joachim & Andrew Raymond produced this film Under Suresh Joachim Entertainment Inc. & Joachim International Inc.

Casting
Malayalam actress Navya Nair was initially signed to play the female role but was replaced by Meera Jasmine due to changes in the script.

The film, was expected to begin on 13 April and to be completed and released on 26 April 2009 in attempt to break the current record for the quickest shoot of a feature-length film. The shooting of the film started in Nalla Farm House in Pondicherry on 22 May which will continue till 3 June.

Soundtrack 
Soundtrack was composed by Deva.

Critical reception
The New Indian Express wrote, "Sivappu Mazhai may not have the greatest script going. But it’s a commendable effort from a first time maker, working within a time limit." Indiaglitz called it "a good attempt considering the theme touched by the makers".

References

External links
 
 Suresh Joachim official site
 Suresh Joachim Network

2010 films
2010 action thriller films
2010s Tamil-language films
Indian action thriller films
Films scored by Deva (composer)